is a fifteen-page, all-watercolor manga by Hayao Miyazaki, on which his animated film Porco Rosso is based. It was published in Model Graphix in three parts, a monthly magazine about scale models, as a part of Hayao Miyazaki's "Zassou Note" series. Like other manga in this series, "Hikōtei Jidai" is a manifestation of his love for old planes. It is filled with aircraft from the 1920s (heavily modified by Miyazaki) and their technical details, as well as with the men (good-hearted and silly) who love them.

Hikōtei Jidai was published in 1992 by Dainippon Kaiga.
It is a book of about 60 pages, includes the Porco Rosso manga (15 pages total), several airplane vignettes, resin-kit models of aircraft, photos of some real counterparts of the floatplanes which appeared in the film, and some interviews with Miyazaki regarding airplane model kits.

Differences from Porco Rosso
Compared with the anime version, the manga is much more light-hearted. Other than being a "retired Italian Air Force pilot", Porco's past is not discussed, although the rise of fascism and the sentiment against it are mentioned. Gina doesn't appear at all, and Porco is much more lighthearted. Still, the basic story line and its charm are carried over into the anime.

For the dogfight between Porco and Donald Chuck (the character was renamed Donald Curtiss in the anime), Miyazaki wrote; "If this were animation, I might be able to convey the grandeur of this life-or-death battle. But this is a comic. I have no choice but to rely on the imagination of you, good readers." (At the time, the Porco Rosso anime had not yet been announced.)

Mamma Aiuto, who Porco saves in Part One, is also the name of a seaplane pirate gang in the movie. It is also Italian for "Help, mom!"

The story
It's the 1920s over the Adriatic Sea. Air pirates with their seaplanes plague the sea, attacking ships, robbing money, and kidnapping women. Enter an Italian bounty hunter, Porco Rosso. Flying his red seaplane, he is the best in the business. He is a very dashing fellow and women love him. There is, however, one peculiarity about him - he is a pig.

Part One
Porco Rosso saves a girl from the air pirates, the Mamma Aiuto gang.

Part Two
Porco is shot down by an American, Donald Chuck. Porco takes his plane to Milan-based Piccolo, SPA, for repairs. Fio, a 17-year-old girl, redesigns and improves his plane.

Part Three
Porco and Chuck have a great air battle for Fio and for Italian pride.

Legacy
Hikōtei Jidai was the basis for Miyazaki's 1993 anime film Porco Rosso. In addition, the Disney television series TaleSpin also took inspiration from Hikōtei Jidai.

See also

Hayao Miyazaki's Daydream Data Notes, the entire series of Miyazaki's manga publications in Model Graphix magazine.

References

1989 manga
Aviation comics
Comics by Hayao Miyazaki
Comics set in Italy
Comics set in the 1920s
Manga adapted into films
Works set during the Great Depression